The men's 10,000 metres was an event at the 1956 Summer Olympics in Melbourne, Australia, held on Friday November 23, 1956. There were a total number of 25 participants from 15 nations.

From the gun, favorite Vladimir Kuts took the lead.  Only Gordon Pirie was able to maintain contact as Kuts pushed the pace.  Then at the conclusion of 12 laps, Kuts swung wide to let Pirie go by.  Pirie obliged while Kuts took the rear for a little less than 200 meters, then Kuts accelerated back into the lead.  In the last mile, Pirie was broken, Kuts pulled away to an ever-increasing lead.  The chase group settled the remaining medals with a final sprint as József Kovács beat Allan Lawrence to the line for silver.  Pirie struggled home a lap behind.

Final classification

References

External links
 Official Report
 Results

M
10,000 metres at the Olympics
Men's events at the 1956 Summer Olympics